Little Red Tractor is a British children's television series produced by The Little Entertainment Company and was co-produced by Entertainment Rights for the first two series. The ten-minute episodes were broadcast in the United Kingdom by the BBC on the CBeebies channel.

The series is produced using stop motion model animation and features unusually detailed sets and models. The series features the popular voices of Stephen Tompkinson and Derek Griffiths. The characters are based on the books by Colin Reeder, which were narrated for video in the mid 1990s by Brian Glover and Richard Briers. The show is mainly aimed at an audience at Preschool.

History
Little Red Tractor Projects Limited owned the original Little Red Tractor video series. Although it didn't have television exposure, Little Red Tractor broke into the top ten children's videos and stayed there for several weeks. In total, the original series sold over 300,000 copies. Contender the distributor wanted to duplicate that success. However, the television rights were sold to Keith Littler's Little Entertainment Group because Peter Tye, the director/writer of the series, preferred their expertise in stop frame animation and empathy with the original. Despite losing the television rights to Little Red Tractor, Contender went ahead and produced their similar series, CITV's Tractor Tom. Despite apparent similarities to Tractor Tom, Little Red Tractor has a completely different style, with more realistic story-lines, a larger human cast, and no surreal livestock behaviour.

Characters
Stan (voiced by Stephen Tompkinson) is Little Red Tractor's driver and constant companion. Stan lives at Gosling Farm, and keeps two cows Daisy and Veronica, and two pigs.
Little Red Tractor (leader) is a small and old but reliable red farm tractor, mute but capable of expressing emotions. Stan restored him to his farm as in new condition.
Patch is Stan's dog, Patch is depicted as a male in the 2004 series whereas in the original stories depict Patch as a female.
Mr. Jones (voiced by Derek Griffiths) is Stan's neighbour and owner of Big Blue Tractor and Harvey. He often appears selfish, materialistic or otherwise antisocial, but tends to be socially inept or smug rather than actually unpleasant. His first name is revealed to be Jasper and he lives at Beech Farm.
Big Blue Tractor (co-leader) is a large, up-to-date blue farm tractor owned by Mr. Jones. Has no anthropomorphic traits, but can blow his horn by himself. In the original stories he was named Big Fred.
Harvey is an orange combine harvester owned by Mr. Jones but sometimes borrowed by Stan.
Thomas is Mr. Jones' nephew who comes to stay at Beech farm with him on occasion since Mr. Jones' sister moved back from the city to the country. Thomas is learning to like the country life which he initially thought was smelly, dirty and not as good as computer games.
Stumpy (voiced by Jimmy Hibbert) is the miller. Friendly, mildly eccentric and clumsy. Drives his quadbike, "Nipper" very badly. Stumpy plays in Walter's band.
Elsie is Stumpy's wife.
Nipper is a purple quadbike ridden by Stumpy.
Ryan is the child neighbour of Stan. He and his sister like to play with Little Red Tractor and help out.
Amy is Ryan's sister.
Mr. Turvey (voiced by Jimmy Hibbert) is Ryan and Amy's father. He likes to run and plays keyboards in Walters band.
Mrs. Turvey (voiced by Shireen Shah) is Ryan and Amy's mother. She likes to paint and does arts and crafts.
Walter (voiced by Derek Griffiths) is a mechanic who runs the Babblebrook garage and likes to play rock and roll. Walter is easily led astray. Walter is lead singer and plays the guitar for his band called Walter and the Wolverines.
Nicola (voiced by Shireen Shah) is Walter's daughter who also runs the garage. She tends to be far more sensible than her father. Nicola also plays an instrument in her father's band.
Leo is Walter's nephew, becomes a friend of Ryan and Amy. He is a more than competent drummer who stands in for Nicola in Walter's Band.
Sparky is a yellow and blue tow truck which Nicola and Walter drive.
Rusty is Walter's burgundy unreliable car and restoration project who unfortunately breaks down regularly.

Episodes

Series 1 (2004)
 1. The Big Bang (5th January 2004)
 2. The Ladder (8th January 2004)
 3. The Gold Cup (13th January 2004)
 4. Little Red Tractor's Birthday (6th January 2004)
 5. Making Hay (21st January 2004)
 6. The Lucky Day (7th January 2004)
 7. Berries (9th January 2004)
 8. Mr. Fixit (12th January 2004)
 9. Flying (14th January 2004)
 10. The Garage Sale (20th January 2004)
 11. Tiger, Tiger (19th January 2004)
 12. The Windy Day (15th January 2004)
 13. Farm of the Year (27th January 2004)
 14. The Dam (16th January 2004)
 15. The Silence of the Cows (22nd January 2004)
 16. The Big Sneeze (2nd February 2004)
 17. The Secret Den (23rd January 2004)
 18. Mr. Big (29th January 2004)
 19. The Detectives (30th January 2004)
 20. Roof Tops (26th January 2004)
 21. Winter Lights (6th February 2004)
 22. Dog Gone (28th January 2004)
 23. Bye Bye, Blue (3rd February 2004)
 222. Enter the Dragon (5th February 2004)
 25. Water Water (9th February 2004)
 26. The Party (4th February 2004)

Series 2 (2005)
 27. The Beast of Babble-Brook
 28. The New Engine
 29. The Town Boy
 30. Circles in the Corn
 31. Spuds
 32. Little Red Rocker
 33. Glorious Mud
 34. The New Addition
 35. The Tree House
 36. Traction Trouble
 37. Gone With the Wind
 38. Llama Drama
 39. Read All About It
 40. Marrow Mangler
 41. Buried Treasure
 42. The Ghost of Tawny Owl Wood
 43. The Beech Farm Flyer
 44. Paper Chase
 45. Molehills and Windmills
 46. May Day
 47. Scrambled Eggs
 48. Farm Games
 49. Double Trouble
 50. Hot Hot Hot
 51. Cheesed Off
 52. Magic Hat

Series 3 (2007)
 53. Thunder and Dancing
 54. Row Yer Boat
 55. Lost!
 56. Up, Up and Away
 57. One Potato, Two Potato
 58. The Show Must Go On
 59. Too Cold for Snow
 60. Furry Jumper
 61. Topsy Turvey
 62. The Map
 63. The Hill
 64. Run
 65. Movie Madness
 66. Kart Race
 67. What's Up, Duck?
 68. Rambling Rabbits
 69. Milkshake
 70. Electric Trickery
 71. An Unwanted Tractor
 72. Raindance
 73. Bubblegum
 74. Countryside Code
 75. Welcome Home

References

External links
 
 
 
 

2004 British television series debuts
2007 British television series endings
2000s British children's television series
BBC high definition shows
BBC children's television shows
British children's animated adventure television series
British children's animated fantasy television series
British preschool education television series
British television shows based on children's books
English-language television shows
2000s British animated television series
CBeebies
Australian Broadcasting Corporation original programming
Animated preschool education television series
2000s preschool education television series
British stop-motion animated television series